Baptiste Trotignon (born 1974) is a French jazz pianist and composer.

Life and career
Trotignon was born near Paris in 1974. He started playing the violin at the age of 6 and the piano three years later. His first solo piano album was 2003's Solo. Trotignon composes music and plays "interpretations of music from Led Zeppelin and [Bob] Dylan to Edith Piaf".

Playing style
The Daily Telegraph'''s Ivan Hewett wrote on the originality of Trotignon's style in 2009 that "Any references are only subliminally present in a style that's very much his own. He has certain favourite devices such as rapid-fire repetitions of single notes, and machine-gun alternations of the hands".The Guardian'''s John Fordham, commenting on a Trotignon duo concert with percussionist Minino Garay stated that the pianist's playing contained "startling chordal exclamations, plaintively romantic lyricism and [...] a collage of liquid lines and stuttering drumlike invitations to his partner".

Discography

As leader or co-leader

As sideman

References

1974 births
French jazz pianists
French male pianists
Trotignon, Baptiste
21st-century pianists
21st-century French male musicians
French male jazz musicians
Okeh Records artists
Sunnyside Records artists
Naïve Records artists